Soomaa National Park is a national park in south-western Estonia. Soomaa ("land of bogs") protects  390 km², the park was created in 1993.  Soomaa is Important Bird Area since 1989 and a Ramsar site of protected wetlands since 1997 and a Natura 2000 area since 2004.

Geography
The national park, situated in Vahe-Eesti (aka Meso-Estonia), was created in 1993 to protect large raised bogs, flood plain grasslands, paludified forests, and meandering rivers. The territory of the national park is mostly covered with large mires, separated from each other by the rivers of the Pärnu River basin — the Navesti, Halliste, Raudna and Lemmjõgi rivers. Of the raised bogs, the most noteworthy is the Kuresoo Bog, whose steep southern slope, falling into Lemmejõgi, rises by 8 metres over a distance of 100 m.

On the eastern margin of the national park, lie the highest dunes on the Estonian mainland, situated some 50 kilometres off the contemporary coastline. The most characteristic coastal formations of the predecessor of the present Baltic Sea, the Baltic Ice Lake (11,200–10,600 years ago), which marks the one-time water level, are situated on the north-western and western edges of the Sakala Upland. The Ruunaraipe Dunes are the highest of the area. The dune ridge, winding from northwest to southeast is a 1.2 km-long sand ridge, whose maximum height is 12 metres.

In 2009, the Soomaa National Park, as the largest intact peat bog system in Europe preserved as wilderness, joined the PAN Parks network of wilderness areas, as it proved excellence in combining wilderness protection and sustainable tourism development.

Floods 

When vast amounts of water run down the Sakala Upland, the rivers of Soomaa cannot contain it all. The water flows over flood plain grasslands and forests, and covers roads, disrupting connection with the outer world. In some years the spring floods have risen by a meter a day for 3–4 days.

The Riisa flood area is formed in such a way; with a surface area covering 175 square kilometres at its largest, it is the biggest regularly flooded area in Estonia and whole Northern Europe. At the maximum flood level the water-covered area can be 7–8 km across. Steep-sloped, raised bogs stand as islands in the water. The flood is often called the "fifth season" in Soomaa.

Flora and fauna 

Soomaa National Park is the most valuable part of the remaining extensive wilderness area in South-West Estonia. Kuresoo Bog is one of the two best surviving large bogs in Estonia with species diversity amongst the highest.

Flora
The alluvial meadows and forests that cover the riverbanks are of great botanical value. Approximately 200 species have been recorded, including Gladiolus imbricatus, iris sibirica, and Sedum telephium. The unique swamp forests (carrs) surrounding the site are also of special interest.

Fauna
The site regularly supports more than 1% of the individuals in relevant populations of Bewick's swan and common crane, and the composition of bird species in these bogs, especially Kuresoo, is one of the most representative in Estonia. Species recorded include golden eagle, Eurasian whimbrel (more than 100 pairs), European golden plover (ca. 150 pairs), dunlin (ssp. schinzii), merlin, willow ptarmigan, and Montagu's harrier.

During the autumn migration, it is a stopover and roosting site for common cranes (ca. 1,000) and Bewick's swan (ca. 500), and during spring migration there are around 2,000 Bewick's swans. Corncrakes are still numerous on floodplain meadows (50-100 pairs). It is an important spawning ground for the northern pike.

As a large wilderness area,  Soomaa is a home and breeding area for several mammals  that are extinct or very rare in other parts of Europe.  The most numerous large mammal species are the roe deer, elk, and wild boar. Eurasian beaver, Eurasian lynx, grey wolf, brown bear, are also commonly found.

Research
Soomaa National Park and its surroundings are one of the main research areas for large carnivores and herbivores in Estonia. Starting from 2004 several cooperation projects have been organised between State Nature Conservation Centre and universities in Estonia and abroad. The main goal within these studies has been telemetric observation of species like Eurasian lynx and grey wolf.

"In 2009 Soomaa receives PAN Parks certification" for its excellence in combining wilderness protection and sustainable tourism development.

Traditional culture 

In last 70 years, Soomaa National Park area has faced dramatic changes due to the economic and political situation in the 20th century from what human habitation has decreased more than 10 times (87 people according to local municipalities in 2011). With a loss of human inhabitants, a lot of tangible and intangible cultural heritage has been lost as well. To preserve as much of what is left or has been gathered to museums throughout the years a web page http://maastikud.ee/ was created in 2007. Project carried out by local NGOs http://mardu.ee/ and Estonian Literary Museum has brought back several toponyms crucial for the area to reveal its past. Such toponyms play a vital role in modern conservation. Knowledge of traditional landscape usage, read out from these names, can give us a better understanding also on the changes in regions ecology.

Due to its remote location, Soomaa is probably the only place in Europe where the tradition of making dugout canoes (Estonian haabjas) survived into the 20th and 21st centuries. In recent decades, a new surge of interest in making dugouts has revitalized the ancient tradition.

To support Soomaa National Park and its administration, http://keskkonnaamet.ee several NGOs have taken action in different fields:
 Estonian Fund For Nature is one of the initiators on creating of Soomaa NP. Organiser of different monitoring works and conservation holidays today http://talgud.ee. 
 Estonian Fund For Nature is one of the oldest NGOs in the region, dealing mostly with different conservation issues and people living in Tipu village. 
 Tipu Nature School is responsible for nature educational programs
 Mardu Studio is trying to bring back life to one of the few farms left in Soomaa area. Studying local intangible heritage and building an open studio for artists and designers

Recreation and tourism

Visitor Centre
The Soomaa National Park Visitor Centre is situated in South-West Estonia between Pärnu and Viljandi county, being located in the middle of the park 44 km away from the centre of Viljandi and Pärnu cities. Building of the visitor centre was finished in 1998 and has been placed on the historical crossroad of ancient winter ways that were used up to the beginning of 20th century for transporting goods from Pärnu to Viljandi.

The aim of the Visitor Centre is to give all information needed for those tourists, who come to explore the nature of Soomaa. There are printed out information for several nature trails as well as media guides, films and small public library. It is also possible to order nature
educational lectures and participate in different workshops and programs.

Activities

Hiking and study trails
There are several hiking and study trails, placed all over the National Park to explore the nature at its best:
Riisa hiking trail: 5 km / ca 3 h / Riisa bog / watch tower /
Ingatsi hiking trail: 4,5 km / ca 3 h / Kuresoo bog / watch tower /
Beaver trail: 2 km / ca 1,5 h /  Beaver habitat and paludified forest /
Oksa track: 800 m / ca 45.min / culture heritage object and meadows /
Kuuraniidu hiking trail: 1,2 km / ca 1.5 h / old forest habitat / watch tower /
Mulgi meadow: camping site /  flood plain grasslands / rich bird habitat /
Tõramaa hiking trail: 2,5 km / ca 3 h / Halliste meadow, rich bird habitat / bird watchtower /
Meiekose hiking trail: 2,8 km / ca 3 h / old cart road through abandoned Tõramaa village / semi natural habitats /
Kuresoo hiking trail: 32 km / 2 days / various landscape and culture historical sites /
Hüpassaare study trail: 5 km / 2,5 h / Kuresoo bog / semi-natural habitats / museum of Mart Saar
Tipu study trail: 3 km / 2 h / culture historical sites / traditional rural landscape / semi-natural habitats

''More detailed information about Soomaa nature- and hiking trails from State Forest Management Centre homepage 

Tours
There are five seasons in Soomaa – spring, summer, autumn, winter and high-water season. 

Canoeing season lasts from April until October. Canoeing is also one of the best ways to get acquainted with Soomaa. Canoeing on the flooded area is an adventurous experience, floods are common in the
end of March or at the beginning of April. Guided trip on a traditional dugout canoes is an exclusive way of paddling,  log-boat
building camps are organised in summer.

Bog walks can be undertaken in the area, walkways on wooden boards give visitors the opportunity to observe the special flora and fauna of the deep peat bogs.

In winter, when the whole wetland is frozen, snowshoe and sledge tours are being organised over the frozen bogs and in the case of snow also cross-country skiing trips.

In the year 2009 Soomaa National Park was awarded by European Commission as a supreme nature holiday destination.

See also

 Protected areas of Estonia
 List of national parks in the Baltics
 List of protected areas of Estonia
 List of Ramsar sites in Estonia

References

External links

 official Soomaa National Park website
 National parks of Estonia: hiking
 Awarded "EDEN - European Destinations of Excellence" non traditional tourist destination 2009

National parks of Estonia
Ramsar sites in Estonia
Geography of Viljandi County
Geography of Pärnu County
Protected areas established in 1993
1993 establishments in Estonia
Tourist attractions in Viljandi County
Tourist attractions in Pärnu County